Wedding videography is a video production that documents a wedding on video. The final product of the videographer's documentation is commonly called a wedding video. It is also referred to as a wedding movie, or a wedding film.

Wedding videography can trace its roots back to before the invention of the modern video camera through 8mm and 16mm films. When film was the only way to capture moving pictures, a few enterprising individuals would take the family 8mm camera and film the weddings of friends and family. These film cameras had a major limitation in the form of 4-minute load times. After exposing 4 minutes of film, the operator would have to load a new film cartridge. The high cost of processing and the fact the majority of them could not record sound to the film further limited the industry. However, there were still a few individuals who were able to turn the documentation of weddings into a business.

In 1967 Sony introduced the first Portapak, the Sony DV-2400 Video Rover. With the introduction of these first camcorders, wedding video documentation evolved from something only for the rich into something for the masses. Early adopters were primarily hobbyists who at first started recording the weddings of friends and family, then went on to do jobs for pay.

The early days of professional wedding videography were marked by primitive technology and technique, with the equipment generally producing low image quality. Cameras required bright lights, had fuzzy pictures, poor color saturation, and single-channel, poor quality audio. The cameras were bulky, with a separate unit that connected to the video recorder via a cable, severely limiting the videographer's movement.  In post-production, many wedding videos were not edited.  Generation loss was also a limiting factor because of the nature of analog video tape.

In the late 1980s and early 1990s, the state of the industry began to improve. Videographers began to form regional and national organizations, the largest, currently active organization being the Wedding and Event Videographers Association International (WEVA). Manufacturers created a market between the professional video camera and video camera consumer levels, known as the prosumer, which met the needs of this niche market. 
Towards the mid-1990s, the manufacturers introduced digital cameras, removing the last of the technological barriers that had impeded wedding videography since it was established. The cameras were small, mobile, worked even better than the already good analog cameras on the market in low light situations, and allowed the videographer to be discreet and not an intrusion to the events.

Post-production creativity took a major leap forward with the introduction of advanced tools like the Newtek Video Toaster in the early 1990s. This led to the introduction of other relatively inexpensive non-linear editing systems (NLE), which offered the editor many more creative options. But the delivery method still relied on an analog viewing system, VHS video tape. This changed in the late 1990s with introduction of the recordable DVD. Weddings and events were now recorded digitally, edited digitally, and delivered digitally, greatly improving the image quality.

By the late 1990s, wedding videography had expanded beyond documentation of weddings. The majority of wedding videographers preferred to add the additional term of "event" to their description of service.  New offerings, such as Love Stories, Photo Montages (a retrospective collection of photographs set to music), music videos, family biographies, anniversaries, Bar and Bat Mitzvahs, graduations, and many other one-time events were also being documented in large numbers on video. The general skill level of the industry's members improved and post-production capabilities reflected the standards of commercial productions.

Typical styles
Common styles range from "journalistic" to "cinematic".

Video Journalistic style (also referred to as documentary style) Typically described as a documentary film of the event. Segments are edited as they occur to preserve continuity. This style of editing will produce a polished documentation of the day as it unfolds.

Cinematic Cinematic videography/editing is defined as a ‘filmy' look.  This style aims to increase the emotional impact through use of slow motion and transition effects, saturated colors, creative camera angles and dramatic music.  It has that 'wow' factor to tell your story in a unique way.

Concept Videos Concept wedding video is the most artistic and elaborated type of wedding videos. It is usually scripted and includes a lot of preparation, usually a few pre wedding shoots, interviews with the couple or guests and finally the wedding video itself.

Short Form WeddingAlthough there is no official standard, the generally accepted rule of thumb for a short form is between 10-45 minutes in length. The first thing you will probably notice when viewing a film is that events don’t always occur in chronological order. That’s not to say, however, that it doesn’t flow. In fact most times it can have a very concise flow. The reason being is that couples trust the videographers creative instincts, which in turn allows us to tell a more compelling story by shifting around certain moments. This is known as "time-shifting." Normally the different elements of the day are connected by speeches, sound bites or vows from the ceremony, together they tell a compete story.

Instagram Videos Since the rise in popularity of mobile phones and social media apps, especially Instagrams popularity there has been an increase in much shorter wedding videos. The typical length of an Instagram video is 15 seconds to 60 seconds for the Instagram feed. You can also upload longer videos too to IGTV.
 
Drone shots Drones have become more common at weddings which has seen a surge in Aerial photography and videography.

While in some traditions the wedding is the most important event of one's life, in others it is regarded as a mere celebration. The more traditional and orthodox religions regard weddings as a very important tradition and invest large amounts of money in this event, even making loans.

Types of video 

Wedding video has grown in recent years to encompass countless video production offerings. Some are produced to be shown at the wedding or are delivered after the wedding.

Engagement/proposal video A video documenting how one person proposes to his or her partner. An engagement/proposal video is usually filmed without the other person's knowledge in order to capture the other person's genuine reaction & surprise.

Invitation DVD Some invitation printers will include a DVD in a slot in the printed invitation.  The DVD shows the couple and/or the parents on camera inviting viewers to the wedding and reception.

Photo montage (also called video scrapbooks) Includes but is not limited to still pictures displayed on a video. Can also include sound bites and video footage, but is predominantly still photos.

Love story Traditionally an interview of the soon to be couple about how they met, what they are like together and what their plans for the future are. Quite often the interview is inter-cut with romantic footage of the couple frolicking together or re-enactments of what they are talking about.

Concept video Typically a short film that incorporates to tell a story about the bride or groom or both. Quite often not related to the couple's real life.

Same day edit (also called a wedding day edit, sometimes abbreviated as SDE) A short video (usually 3 to 5 minutes) produced from the footage of the wedding shot earlier in the day, usually incorporating footage from pre-ceremony (getting ready), ceremony, photoshoot, reception entrance and first dance, which is then showed near the end of the reception (usually prior to the bride & groom speeches) as a recap of the wedding. It is also possible to incorporate footage shot prior to the wedding in the same day edit.

Next day edit (sometimes abbreviated as NDE)
 A next day edit is similar in concept as a Same Day Edit, except it is made overnight to be played the next day. A next day edit is a short video (usually 3 to 5 minutes) produced from the footage captured during the day, edited over night, to be played the next day. It is quite common to see Next Day Edit videos in South Asian weddings where there are multiple days of events. A wedding can have the ceremony take place on Saturday and have a Next Day Edit video played during the reception on Sunday evening.

Bridal elegance A video shot in the style of a fashion shoot that depicts the bride in her wedding gown. Can be done before, during or after the wedding.

Highlights A wedding highlight video is usually a 3 to 12 minutes video/short film that highlights the best moments of the wedding day. A highlight video can be edited in Non-linear or Linear fashion. A linear highlight video is a highlight video that shows the sequence of the day in chronological order. A non-linear highlight video focus on story telling, thus, footage & speeches are sometimes shown out of chronological order to tell an engaging story. Is quite common to share highlight video on YouTube, Vimeo, Facebook, Instagram and other social networks to family and friends. The shorter highlight video is quite often popular for showing to friends, while immediate family members and close friends might want watch the full-length wedding video.

Trash the dress A fad that struck the video and photography markets from 2005 to 2008. The idea was to create art by soaking, staining, dirtying or outright destroying the wedding gown. The shoot often occurred after the wedding day.

See also
 Event videography
 Wedding photography

References

Further reading

Film and video technology
Videography